Reggae Report was a U.S.-based music and culture magazine first published in 1983.  The publication offered an abundance of news and information regarding reggae, Caribbean, and world music artists and entertainers, including soca, African, and hip hop. Reggae Report was founded by publisher M. Peggy Quattro and Michael "Zappow" Williams. With combined industry connections and experience that bridged the gap from reggae's beginnings to the artists making the most popular music of the day, Quattro and Williams began Reggae Report to spread the word, educate the fans about its rich history, and bring up-close-and-personal interviews and photographs to a targeted international fan base.

The Miami, Florida-based magazine owed its success to reggae's rising popularity. Its credibility and timeliness resulted in Reggae Report excelling in a market with limited print competition. Its mission was to introduce the music and accompanying culture and lifestyle to a large multi-ethnic US and North American base. The enthusiastic support shown by artists, musicians, and industry professionals in Jamaica, the UK, and the US resulted in increased advertising and distribution, as well as an enthusiastic international subscriber base.

Reggae was still young in the early 1980s, and in the US it was basically undiscovered. By the late '80s, the magazine had achieved regional, national, and international distribution.  At its peak, Reggae Report was distributed in 42 countries. Advertisers ranged from record companies and record distributors, to airlines, clothing lines, beverages, food items, restaurants, accessories, and record and gift stores. Its growing popularity brought accolades, articles, and awards, but the dawning of instant Internet news resulted in the publication ceasing its print version. Reggae Report transformed into ReggaeReport.com in 1999 and its online site is active today.

Publication history 
Reggae Report was founded by M. Peggy Quattro, an American reggae fan, writer, and former assistant manager to Bob Marley, Gregory Isaacs, and Jimmy Cliff; and Kingston-born Michael "Zappow" Williams, acclaimed musician, producer, and songwriter, renowned for the band Zap Pow and writing the anthem "This is Reggae Music."  In 1983, there wasn't any good press on Reggae, there was no way to get information on the artists—that's where the magazine idea came from—to fill this void. Williams returned to Jamaica in 1985.

Quattro, inspired by the music's spirituality and frustrated that it was misunderstood,  continued publishing the magazine, traveling extensively to Jamaica and the Caribbean, as well as to England and major US cities, bringing news to the fans and exposure to the artists. Reggae Report can boast of introducing countless fans to Reggae and functioning as an important source of information.

Reggae Report and M. Peggy Quattro produced the 1986 fan-favorite Small Axe Awards, which showcased performances by the top names in Jamaican Reggae. The publication produced stage and club shows, and promoted events where fans would win prizes, including T-shirts, CDs, and an all-expense-paid trip to Jamaica.  "Those fans were supportive and kept me going, because it certainly hasn't been the money," says Quattro.  In addition to magazines, Reggae Report also produced annual calendars with artists' photos, birthdays, and events, and a variety of Reggae Report T-shirts and beach bags.

In 1998, after declining sales, brought on by the entrance of the  World Wide Web, Quattro closed down the print version and began ReggaeReport.com in 1999.  In 2010, plans began to institute the Reggae Report Archive. This online, digital 30 year collection of magazines, photographs, video, audio, and interesting memorabilia documents the history of reggae from the late 1970s to the end of the '90s. Articles, photos, video, and more from 2000 to 2010 are also available.

Content
The magazine covered multiple reggae styles, including Lovers Rock, Roots & Culture, Rock Steady, Ska, Dub, and Dancehall.  In the mid-'80s, Reggae Report took a stand against 'slackness,' a form of Dancehall that was raunchy and out of sync with Roots Rock Reggae. "We didn't endorse it or support it," says Quattro The magazine's regular featured segments included articles, interviews, event and CD reviews. Departments included Yard Report, USA Reggae, Fresh on de Scene, New Releases, International Top 10 Charts, World a'Reggae, International Reggae, Poetry, Did U Knows, So Jah Seh, and So Dem Seh (Letters to the Editor.)  Other content included discographies and retrospectives.

Reggae Report produced annual special issues, such as Dancehall Rules!, Roots and Culture, and the annual Bob Marley Tribute issue. In addition, there were specials, such as Women in Reggae, the UK Special, and a New York Special.  Peter Tosh, Lucky Dube, Third World, Ziggy Marley, and Jimmy Cliff were popular cover features. Fan favorites covered include Maxi Priest, UB40, Toots and the Maytals, Steel Pulse, Buju Banton, Garnett Silk, Aswad, Shaggy, Stephen and Damian Marley, Black Uhuru, Sugar Minott, Dennis Brown, Gregory Isaacs, Burning Spear, Culture, Marcia Griffiths, Diana King, and Pato Banton. Bob Marley's Manager Don Taylor stated, "She's done a lot for Reggae music. Some of [those acts] depend on her for the only magazine exposure they'll get."

Many of today's successful writers and photographers began at Reggae Report and contributed over the years.  Writers include Sara Gurgen (Editor), Patricia Meschino, Lee O'Neill, Cynthia Wegmann, Howard Campbell, Jeffrey Dawkins, Amy Wachtel, Ryan MacMichael, and Shelah Moody.  Photographers include Lee Abel, Jan Salzman, Jeffrey Dawkins, Jeffrey DawkinsJr, Thor Olson, Maverick, Tim Barrow, and Barbara Reuther.

Awards 
For Best Reggae Magazine:
 The Martin's Most Popular Reggae Magazine Award - 1987, 1989, 1990, and 1991
 The South Florida Reggae-Soca Award - 1994 and 1995
Recognition:
 Miami-Dade County Commendation for Community Spirit - 1986
 Air Jamaica Award for Support - 1990
 Fanfare Int'l - For Outstanding Contribution to Caribbean Media - 1993
 The Bob Marley World Peace Award - Antigua, 1995

More projects 
 1986 - The Small Axe Awards - Voted for by the fans - Miami Beach, FL
 1991 - Co-produced Reggae USA, a compilation cassette with ROIR Records
 1998 - Executive Producer - Dancehall Dynamite, a compilation CD for Atlantic/Relativity Records

References

External links
 ReggaeReport.com
 Shop for Retro Cover Tees, Vintage Posters, Rare Vinyl, Promo Prints, & more!

1983 establishments in Florida
1999 disestablishments in Florida
Defunct magazines published in the United States
Magazines established in 1983
Magazines disestablished in 1999
Magazines published in Florida
Mass media in Miami
Music magazines published in the United States